{{DISPLAYTITLE:C21H26O2}}
The molecular formula C21H26O2 (molar mass : 310.42 g/mol, exact mass : 310.19328) may refer to:

 Altrenogest
 Cannabinol
 Cannabinodiol
 Gestodene, a progesterone contraceptive hormone
 Mestranol
 Plomestane